00s or 00s may refer to:
 Hundreds (the third column of magnitude in the decimal system)
 The decade spanning years 2000–2009
 The period from AD 1 to 99, almost synonymous with the 1st century (AD 1–100)
 00S, McKenzie Bridge State Airport in Oregon
 Any century or the term century in general

Periods of 10 years

Periods of 100 years

See also 
 OOS (disambiguation)
 00 (disambiguation)
 OO (disambiguation)